WLI may refer to:

Wang Laboratories
Wolfe Laboratories
USCG inland buoy tenders
Oracle WebLogic Integration
white light interferometry
Whole Life Insurance
Welling railway station